Robert Walter "Whirlwind" Johnson (April 16, 1899 – June 28, 1971) was an American physician, college football player and coach, and founder of the American Tennis Association Junior Development Program for African-American youths, where he coached and fostered the careers of Arthur Ashe and Althea Gibson.

College football career
Johnson graduated in 1924 from Lincoln University, a historically black college in Pennsylvania. He was a classmate of Melvin B. Tolson. Johnson played college football as a halfback at Lincoln and was captain of the 1923 Lincoln Lions football team, which won a black college football national championship. He was selected to the All-Colored Intercollegiate Athletic Association (CIAA) First Team in 1923.

Johnson served as the head football coach at Virginia Theological Seminary and College—now known as Virginia University of Lynchburg–in 1924, Samuel Huston College in Austin, Texas in 1925, and Morris Brown College in Atlanta in 1926. In 1927 he was assistant football coach at Atlanta University in charge of the backfield and ends under head football coach Chief Aiken. Johnson was the manager of Aiken and Faulkner Rent Department at the time.

Medical career
Johnson was the first African-American physician to receive practice rights at Lynchburg General Hospital in Virginia. Johnson continued his medical practice in Lynchburg for his entire career.

Tennis career
Known as the "godfather" of black tennis, Johnson founded an all-expenses-paid tennis camp for African-American children and hired instructors. In these years in the segregated South, they had no public courts where they could learn tennis, and many did not have money for lessons. Johnson was instrumental in encouraging the athletic careers of both Althea Gibson and Arthur Ashe, who he coached.

Death
Johnson died on June 28, 1971, at a hospital in Lynchburg, Virginia, following a seven-month-long illness.

Legacy and honors
 Johnson was inducted into the Virginia Sports Hall of Fame in 1972.
 Johnson was nominated as a contributor in 2007 for the International Tennis Hall of Fame and was inducted with the Class of 2009.
 His home and training center, the Dr. Robert Walter Johnson House and Tennis Court, was listed on the National Register of Historic Places in 2002.
 The Walter Johnson Health Center, a large medical care and community health education center in downtown Lynchburg, Virginia, was named in his honor.
 The Dr. Robert Walter Johnson Memorial Invitational, Petersburg, Virginia

Head coaching record

Football

References

External links
 International Tennis Hall of Fame profile
 

1899 births
1971 deaths
20th-century American physicians
American football halfbacks
American tennis coaches
Clark Atlanta Panthers football coaches
Lincoln Lions football coaches
Lincoln Lions football players
Meharry Medical College alumni
Samuel Huston Dragons football coaches
Virginia–Lynchburg Dragons football coaches
Sportspeople from Lynchburg, Virginia
International Tennis Hall of Fame inductees
Physicians from Virginia
African-American physicians
African-American coaches of American football
African-American players of American football
20th-century African-American sportspeople